Henry Denifle, in German Heinrich Seuse Denifle (January 16, 1844 in Imst, Tyrol – June 10, 1905 in Munich), was an Austrian paleographer and historian.

References
Russo, Antonio, La Scuola cattolica di Franz Brentano: Heinrich Suso Denifle, Trieste, EUT 2003, con un carteggio inedito F. Brentano - H. Denifle.
Russo, Antonio, Franz Brentano and Heinrich S. Denifle, in A. Russo, J. L. Vieillard-Baron, Scritti in onore di X. Tilliette, Trieste, 2004, pp. 203–238.
Russo, Antonio, Franz Brentano and Heinrich Suso, "Denifle alla scuola di Aristotile," in “Studium”, 3, 2003,pp. 333–356]].

19th-century Austrian historians
Historians of the Catholic Church
19th-century Austrian Roman Catholic theologians
Austrian Dominicans
1844 births
1905 deaths